"Someone to Love Me for Me" is a song recorded by Lisa Lisa and Cult Jam and Full Force that appeared on their 1987 album Spanish Fly. The song hit number 78 on the Billboard Hot 100 chart and number 7 on the R&B chart in December 1987.

Charts

References

External links
"Someone to Love Me for Me" (1987) releases at Discogs

1987 singles
Lisa Lisa and Cult Jam songs
1987 songs
Columbia Records singles
Song recordings produced by Full Force